The Flight of Five Locks on the Erie Canal in Lockport, New York is a staircase lock constructed to lift or lower a canal boat over the Niagara Escarpment in five stages.

The locks are part of the Erie Canalway National Heritage Corridor.

In Stairway to Empire: Lockport, the Erie Canal, and the Shaping of America, (SUNY Press, 2009), historian Patrick McGreevy details the construction of the locks.  The "Stairway" of McGreeevy's title is the Flight of Five Locks.

History
To carry the canal across the Niagara Escarpment, the engineers built a five-step staircase lock.

Restoration
The restored locks reopened in 2014.

References

Staircase locks
Erie Canal
Historic Civil Engineering Landmarks